William Christian may refer to:
Bill Christian (born 1938), American Olympic ice hockey player
William Christian (1608–1663), also known as Illiam Dhone, Manx political leader
William Christian (Virginia politician) (1743–1786), military officer, planter and politician
William Christian (political scientist) (born 1945), Canadian political scientist
William A. Christian (born 1944), American religious historian
William Christian (actor) (born 1955), American television actor